Branko Bokun (Serbian Cyrillic: Бранко Бокун; 28 June 1920 – 1 January 2011) was an author in the fields of sociology and psychology.

Early life
Bokun was born in Koljane, Croatia, a small village in the Dalmatian mountains of the Kingdom of Yugoslavia. He began to study at the University of Belgrade; however his education there was interrupted by the German invasion of Yugoslavia in 1941. He fled to Italy, where he enrolled at the University of Rome, studying economics and social sciences. At the same time he also signed on as an extra with the Cinecittà film studio in order to earn a living. Later, he acted as a go-between on behalf of the Yugoslavian embassy to the Holy See, communicating with the many Yugoslav Jews who were hidden in Italy at the time. He recorded these years in his Spy in the Vatican, 1941–45 (1973).He also exposed the genocide committed by the Ustashi in the so-called Independent State of Croatia against its citizens, the Serbs, Roma and Jews.

Bokun graduated from the University of Rome in 1945 and went on to attend the Sorbonne University in Paris, taking courses in sociology and social psychology, and graduating in 1949. In Paris he at one time supported himself by working as a dishwasher.

Life in England
In 1960 Bokun settled in London, United Kingdom, where he remained for the rest of his life. After his death at the Chelsea and Westminster Hospital on 1 January 2011, an obituary in The Times described him as "a beguiling Balkan boulevardier, author and anecdotist, and for half a century a familiar figure in the cafés and bookshops of Chelsea." He left a son and two grandchildren.

Bibliography 
 Are We Freaks of Nature?: A New View on Evolution 
 Humour and Pathos in Judaeo-Christianity 
 Spy in the Vatican, 1941-45
 Stress-addiction: A New Theory on Evolution
 Self-help with Stress: A New Approach
 The Pornocracy
 Man — The Fallen Ape
 Bioeconomy — Matriarchy in Post-capitalism
 Humour Therapy

See also
 Edmond Paris
 Viktor Novak
 Avro Manhattan

References

External links 
 
 Vita Books — Branko Bokun's books website, which makes his most recent book - The Origin of the Mind and its Follies/Humour Remedy available for free download.
 Humour Remedy, Global Ideas Bank

1920 births
2011 deaths
20th-century Croatian people
Yugoslav writers
Yugoslav sociologists
Yugoslav psychologists
Yugoslav diplomats
Croatian sociologists
Croatian psychologists
University of Belgrade alumni
University of Paris alumni
Yugoslav expatriates in Italy
Yugoslav expatriates in France
Yugoslav emigrants to the United Kingdom
People from Vrlika